"The Bartender and the Thief" is a song by Welsh rock band Stereophonics, written by the band in April 1998. The song is the second track on their second album, Performance and Cocktails (1999). "Bartender" was the first single taken from Performance and Cocktails and was released on 9 November 1998, reaching number three on the UK Singles Chart. The music video features the band playing at Kanchanaburi Province, Thailand, and is based on the Francis Ford Coppola movie Apocalypse Now.

Versions
The track's full-length intro is only included on the CD1 single and in the music video but was edited off the album. A live version from Cardiff Castle is available on CD2 of the single. Another live version from Sheffield Arena is on the "Moviestar" single. A bar version of the song is on CD 1 of the "I Wouldn't Believe Your Radio" single.

Live performances
The song, which is one of Stereophonics' heavier tracks, is frequently played amongst their live sets. During live performances, vocalist Kelly Jones has been known to use the two bars without vocals before the final chorus to reference the Motörhead song "Ace of Spades". The lyrics therefore are "The ace of spades, the ace of spades. The bartender and the thief were lovers..."

Track listings

UK CD1
 "The Bartender and the Thief"
 "She Takes Her Clothes Off"
 "Fiddler's Green" 

UK CD2
 "The Bartender and the Thief" (live from Cardiff Castle)
 "Traffic" (live from Cardiff Castle)
 "Raymond's Shop" (live from Cardiff Castle)

UK 7-inch and cassette single
 "The Bartender and the Thief"
 "She Takes Her Clothes Off"

European and Australian CD single
 "The Bartender and the Thief"
 "She Takes Her Clothes Off"
 "The Bartender and the Thief" (live)
 "Traffic" (live)
 "Raymond's Shop" (live)

Credits and personnel
Credits are taken from the Performance and Cocktails album booklet.

Recording
 Written in April 1998
 Recorded at Real World (Bath, Somerset, England)
 Mastered at Metropolis (London, England)

Personnel

 Kelly Jones – music, lyrics, vocals, guitar
 Richard Jones – music, bass
 Stuart Cable – music, drums
 Marshall Bird – keyboards
 Bird & Bush – production
 Al Clay – mixing
 Ian Cooper – mastering

Charts

Weekly charts

Year-end charts

Certifications

References

 

1998 singles
1998 songs
Songs written by Kelly Jones
Stereophonics songs
UK Independent Singles Chart number-one singles
V2 Records singles